Ronald Joseph Goulart (January 13, 1933 – January 14, 2022) was an American popular culture historian and mystery, fantasy, and science fiction author.

He published novelizations and other work under various pseudonyms: Kenneth Robeson, Con Steffanson, Chad Calhoun, R. T. Edwards, Ian R. Jamieson, Josephine Kains, Jillian Kearny, Howard Lee, Zeke Masters, Frank S. Shawn, and Joseph Silva.

Life and career
Ronald Joseph Goulart was born in Berkeley, California, on January 13, 1933. He attended the University of California, Berkeley, and worked there as an advertising copywriter in San Francisco while beginning to write fiction.

Goulart's first professional publication was a 1952 reprint of the SF story "Letters to the Editor" in The Magazine of Fantasy & Science Fiction; this parody of a pulp magazine letters column was originally published in the University of California, Berkeley's Pelican. His early career in advertising and marketing influenced most of his work. In the early 1960s, Goulart wrote the text for Chex Press, a newspaper parody published on Ralston Purina cereal boxes (Wheat Chex, Rice Chex, Corn Chex). Since then he wrote dozens of novels and countless short stories, spanning genres and using a variety of pennames, including Kenneth Robeson, Joseph Silva, and Con Steffanson. He contributed to P.S. and other magazines, along with his book review column for Venture Science Fiction Magazine. Cheap Thrills: An Informal History of the Pulp Magazines (1972) is his best known non-fiction book.

Fiction

Goulart's fiction is characterized by several themes, including technology gone wrong (usually through incompetence rather than malice) and protagonists with superhuman powers. The characteristic style of his work is satire and anarchic humor. His crime and science fiction works include tales about robots and historical Hollywood figures, such as Groucho Marx. In the 1970s, he wrote several novels based on Lee Falk's The Phantom for Avon Books, using the pseudonym "Frank Shawn" (a play on his wife and son's names). He has also written comic book stories and short stories about The Phantom for Moonstone Books from 2003 to the present. As a commercial freelance writer, Goulart has written novelizations for television programs such as Laverne & Shirley, as well as romance novels using female pseudonyms.

It is widely known that Goulart ghost wrote the TekWar series of books credited to the actor William Shatner (Shatner is said to have written the outlines for the books). He has also ghosted novels featuring the Phantom, Flash Gordon and the pulp character The Avenger.

A collection of his mystery short stories, Adam and Eve on a Raft, was published in 2001 by Crippen & Landru.

Comics
In the early 1970s, Goulart wrote several scripts for Marvel Comics, mostly adaptations of classic science fiction stories. Later in the decade, he collaborated with artist Gil Kane on the Star Hawks newspaper strip. In the early 1990s, he scripted Marvel's TekWar comics series.

Personal life and death
Goulart was married to author Frances Sheridan Goulart and has two sons, Sean-Lucien and Steffan Eamon. He died from respiratory arrest at a nursing home in Ridgefield, Connecticut, on January 14, 2022, one day after his 89th birthday.

Awards
Goulart has been nominated twice for the Edgar Award, once for his 1970 science fiction novel After Things Fell Apart. He was awarded the Inkpot Award in 1989.

Bibliography

Non-fiction
The Hardboiled Dicks: An Anthology and Study of Pulp Detective Fiction (1967)
Assault on Childhood (1970)
Cheap Thrills: An Informal History of the Pulp Magazines (1972)
The Adventurous Decade: Comic Strips In the Thirties (Crown Publishers, 1975) 
Comic Book Culture: An Illustrated History (1980)
The Dime Detectives (1982)
The Great Comic Book Artists (St. Martin's Press, 1986) 
Focus on Jack Cole (1986)
Ron Goulart's Great History of Comic Books: the Definitive Illustrated History from the 1890s to the 1980s (Contemporary Books, 1986) 
 (editor) The Encyclopedia of American Comics: From 1897 to the Present (Facts on File, 1991) 
 The Comic Book Reader's Companion: an A-Z Guide to Everyone's Favorite Art Form (Harper Perennial, 1993) 
Masked Marvels and Jungle Queens: Great Comic Book Covers of the '40s (1993)
 The Funnies: 100 Years of American Comic Strips (Adams Media Corp, 1995) 
 Comic Book Encyclopedia: The Ultimate Guide to Characters, Graphic Novels, Writers, and Artists in the Comic Book Universe (Harper Collins, 2004) 
Good Girl Art (2006)
Good Girl Art Around the World (2008)
Alex Raymond: An Artistic Journey: Adventure, Intrigue, and Romance (2016)

Non-series novels
 Clockwork Pirates (1971)
 Ghost Breaker (1971)
 Wildsmith (1972)
 The Tin Angel (1973)
 The Hellhound Project (1975)
 When the Waker Sleeps (1975)
 The Enormous Hourglass (1976)
 The Emperor of the Last Days (1977)
 Nemo (1977)
 Challengers of the Unknown (1977)
 The Island of Dr Moreau (1977) (writing as Joseph Silva)
 Capricorn One (1978)
 Cowboy Heaven (1979)
 Holocaust for Hire (1979) (writing as Joseph Silva)
 Skyrocket Steele (1980)
 The Robot in the Closet (1981)
 The Tremendous Adventures of Bernie Wine (1981)
 Upside Downside (1981)
 The Great British Detective (1982)
 Hellquad (1984)
 Suicide, Inc. (1985)
 A Graveyard of My Own (1985)
 The Tijuana Bible (1989)
 Even the Butler Was Poor (1990)
 Now He Thinks He's Dead (1992)
 Murder on the Aisle (1996)

Novel series
Flash Gordon (Alex Raymond's original story)
 The Lion Men of Mongo (1974)('adapted by' Con Steffanson)
 The Space Circus (1974)('adapted by' Con Steffanson)
 The Plague of Sound (1974)('adapted by' Con Steffanson)
 The Time Trap of Ming XIII (1974)('adapted by' Con Steffanson)
 The Witch Queen of Mongo (1974)('adapted by' Carson Bingham)
 The War of the Cybernauts (1975)('adapted by' Carson Bingham)
The Phantom (writing as Frank S Shawn)
 The Golden Circle (1973)
The Hydra Monster (1973)
 The Mystery of the Sea Horse (1973)
 The Veiled Lady (1973)
 The Swamp Rats (1974)
The Goggle-Eyed Pirates (1974)
Vampirella
 Bloodstalk (1975)
 On Alien Wings (1975)
 Deadwalk (1976)
 Blood Wedding (1976)
 Deathgame (1976)
 Snakegod (1976)
 Vampirella (1976)

Avenger
 The Man from Atlantis (1974) (as Kenneth Robeson)
 Red Moon (1974) (as Kenneth Robeson)
 The Purple Zombie (1974) (as Kenneth Robeson)
 Dr. Time (1974) (as Kenneth Robeson)
 The Nightwitch Devil (1974) (as Kenneth Robeson)
 Black Chariots (1974) (as Kenneth Robeson)
 The Cartoon Crimes (1974) (as Kenneth Robeson)
 The Death Machine (1975) (as Kenneth Robeson)
 The Blood Countess (1975) (as Kenneth Robeson)
 The Glass Man (1975) (as Kenneth Robeson)
 The Iron Skull (1975) (as Kenneth Robeson)
 Demon Island (1975) (as Kenneth Robeson)

Barnum System
 The Fire-Eater (1970)
 Clockwork Pirates (1971)
 Shaggy Planet (1973)
 Spacehawk, Inc. (1974)
 The Wicked Cyborg (1978)
 Dr. Scofflaw (1979)
Barnum System – Jack Summer
 Death Cell (1971)
 Plunder (1972)
 A Whiff of Madness (1976)
 Galaxy Jane (1986)
Barnum System – Ben Jolson
 The Sword Swallower (1968)
 Flux (1974)
Barnum System – Star Hawks
 Empire 99 (1980)
 The Cyborg King (1981)
Barnum System – The Exchameleon
 Daredevils, LTD. (1987)
 Starpirate's Brain (1987)
 Everybody Comes to Cosmo's (1988)

Jack Conger
 A Talent for the Invisible (1973)
 The Panchronicon Plot (1977)
 Hello, Lemuria, Hello (1979)

Odd Jobs, Inc.
 Calling Dr. Patchwork (1978)
 Hail Hibbler (1980)
 Big Bang (1982)
 Brainz, Inc. (1985)

Fragmented America
 After Things Fell Apart (1970)
 Gadget Man (1971)
 Hawkshaw (1972)
 When the Waker Sleeps (1975)
 Crackpot (1977)
 Brinkman (1981)

Gypsy
 Quest of the Gypsy (1976)
 Eye of the Vulture (1977)

Marvel Novel Series (as Joseph Silva; with Len Wein and Marv Wolfman)
 Incredible Hulk: Stalker from the Stars (1977)
 Captain America: Holocaust for Hire (1979)

Harry Challenge
 The Prisoner of Blackwood Castle (1984)
 The Curse of the Obelisk (1987)

Groucho Marx
Groucho Marx, Master Detective (1998)
Groucho Marx, Private Eye (1999)
Elementary, My Dear Groucho (1999)
Groucho Marx and the Broadway Murders (2001)
Groucho Marx, Secret Agent (2002)
Groucho Marx, King of the Jungle (2005)

Short fiction 
Collections
 Broke Down Engine: And Other Troubles with Machines (1971)
 The Chameleon Corps: And Other Shape Changers (1972)
 What's Become of Screwloose?: And Other Inquiries (1972)
 Odd Job 101: And Other Future Crimes And Intrigues (1974)
 Nutzenbolts: And More Troubles with Machines (1975)
 Skyrocket Steele Conquers the Universe: And Other Media Tales (1990)
 Adam and Eve On a Raft: Mystery Stories (Crippen & Landru, 2001)
Stories
 "Ella Speed", Fantastic, April 1960
 "Subject to Change" Galaxy Science Fiction, October 1960
Harry Challenge Series
The Secret of the Black Chateau – Espionage Magazine, February 1985
Monster of the Maze – Espionage Magazine, February 1986
The Phantom Highwayman – The Ultimate Halloween, edited by Marvin Kaye (2001)
The Woman in the Mist – The Magazine of Fantasy & Science Fiction, December, 2002
The Incredible Steam Man – The Magazine of Fantasy & Science Fiction, May, 2003
The Secret of the Scarab – The Magazine of Fantasy & Science Fiction, April, 2005
The Problem of the Missing Werewolf – H. P. Lovecraft's Magazine of Horror #4, (Spring / Summer 2007)
The Mystery of the Missing Automaton – Sherlock Holmes Mystery Magazine #1, (Winter 2008)
The Mystery of the Flying Man – Sherlock Holmes Mystery Magazine #2, (Spring 2009)
The Secret of the City of Gold – The Magazine of Fantasy & Science Fiction, January / February 2012
The Somerset Wonder –

References

External links
 Internet Speculative Fiction Database bibliography
 Ron Goulart Bibliography at Fantastic Fiction
 Encyclopepedia of Science Fiction entry
 
 

1933 births
2022 deaths
20th-century American male writers
20th-century American non-fiction writers
20th-century American novelists
20th-century pseudonymous writers
21st-century American historians
21st-century American male writers
21st-century American non-fiction writers
21st-century American novelists
21st-century pseudonymous writers
American fantasy writers
American humorists
American information and reference writers
American male non-fiction writers
American male novelists
American mystery writers
American science fiction writers
Comics critics
The Magazine of Fantasy & Science Fiction people
Novelists from Connecticut
Inkpot Award winners
Writers from Berkeley, California
University of California, Berkeley alumni